AfterStep is a stacking window manager for the X Window System. The goal of AfterStep's development is to provide for flexibility of desktop configuration, improved aesthetics and efficient use of system resources, and was used in such distributions as MachTen. AfterStep originally was a variant of FVWM modified to resemble NeXTSTEP, but as the development cycle progressed, it diverged from its FVWM roots. In 2000, Linux website TuxRadar selected AfterStep as one of the year's best window managers, praising it as "fast and reliable, with a huge range of configuration options and the ability to create some spectacular themes".

Features 

Features of the AfterStep window manager include:

 Stacking windows
 Written in C
 Window decorations include borders and titlebars
 Titlebars have buttons for menu, minimize, maximize and close
 Active applications can be displayed in a taskbar via the winlist module
 Uses the GTK+ toolkit
 Support for modules
 Support for multiple desktops
 Desktop switching via a pager module
 Dependent on Perl and ImageMagick

Modules 

AfterStep includes several modules such as:

 Pager - a visual tool for managing and cycling between multiple desktops
 WinList - a simple Taskbar displaying active applications
 Wharf - docking tool that manages Applets/Dockapps and launches application.

AfterStep also supports virtual screens, and relies on a set of text-based configuration files for customizing its appearance.

AfterStep is maintained by a small community of developers with Sasha Vasko serving as project manager.

See also

 GNUstep
 Window Maker
 OpenStep
 LiteStep

References

External links
Official website

AfterWiki Main Page
AfterStep Applets
Window Manager for X: AfterStep
Rob's AfterStep Page
AfterStep 1.3.1 article by Guylhem Aznar in Linux Journal

Free X window managers
Software using the MIT license
Window managers that use GTK